Sven Axbom (15 October 1926 − 8 April 2006) was a Swedish footballer who was capped on 31 occasions by Sweden between 1955 and 1960. He played in all six games for Sweden at the 1958 FIFA World Cup, including the final against Brazil.

He was born in Kimstad near Norrköping. He played club football for IFK Norrköping, and in the 1960 season appeared in 16 games for them, whilst in 1956-57 he played two games for them in the European Cup.

References

1926 births
2006 deaths
Swedish footballers
Sweden international footballers
1958 FIFA World Cup players
Allsvenskan players
IFK Norrköping players
Association football defenders